The American Champion Steeplechase Horse is an  American horse racing honor awarded as part of the Eclipse Award program since its inception in 1971. It is awarded annually to the top horse in steeplechase racing.

Flatterer is the only horse to win the award four times in a row, his last coming at age 7 in 1986. Lonesome Glory has won the Award five times, more than any other horse, and was the oldest ever when he won it for the final time at age 11.

Honorees

References

 The Eclipse Awards at the Thoroughbred Racing Associations of America, Inc.
 The Bloodhorse.com Champion's history charts

Horse racing awards
Horse racing in the United States